Commissary Sergeant John Galloway (1843 – May 23, 1904) was an American soldier who fought in the American Civil War. Galloway received his country's highest award for bravery during combat, the Medal of Honor, for his action at Farmville, Virginia in April 1865. He was honored with the award on October 30, 1897.

Galloway joined the 8th Pennsylvania Cavalry from Philadelphia in August 1861. He was promoted to regimental commissary sergeant in January 1865, and was discharged the following July with the rank of first lieutenant.

After the war, he became a companion of the Pennsylvania Commandery of the Military Order of the Loyal Legion of the United States.  He is buried in Mount Moriah Cemetery in Philadelphia, Pennsylvania.

Medal of Honor citation

See also

List of American Civil War Medal of Honor recipients: G–L

References

1843 births
1904 deaths
People of Pennsylvania in the American Civil War
Union Army officers
United States Army Medal of Honor recipients
American Civil War recipients of the Medal of Honor
Military personnel from Philadelphia
Burials at Mount Moriah Cemetery (Philadelphia)